Conrad (25 April 1228 – 21 May 1254), a member of the Hohenstaufen dynasty, was the only son of Emperor Frederick II from his second marriage with Queen Isabella II of Jerusalem. He inherited the title of King of Jerusalem (as Conrad II) upon the death of his mother in childbed. Appointed Duke of Swabia in 1235, his father had him elected King of Germany (King of the Romans) and crowned King of Italy (as Conrad IV) in 1237. After the emperor was deposed and died in 1250, he ruled as King of Sicily (Conrad I) until his death.

Early years
He was the second child, but only surviving son of Emperor Frederick II and Isabella II (Yolanda), the queen regnant of Jerusalem. Born in Andria, in the South Italian Kingdom of Sicily, his mother died shortly after giving birth to him and he succeeded her as monarch of the Crusader state of Jerusalem. By his father, Conrad was the grandson of the Hohenstaufen emperor Henry VI and great-grandson of Emperor Frederick Barbarossa. He lived in Southern Italy until 1235, when he first visited the Kingdom of Germany. During this period his kingdom of Jerusalem, ruled by his father as regent through proxies, was racked by civil war until Conrad declared his majority and his father's regency lost its validity.

In 1235, Conrad was betrothed to a daughter of Duke Otto II of Bavaria. She died before the marriage could take place, but Conrad later married her sister.

Rise to power
When Emperor Frederick II deposed his eldest son, Conrad's rebellious half-brother King Henry (VII), Conrad succeeded him as duke of Swabia in 1235. However, the emperor was not able to have him elected king of the Romans until the 1237 Imperial Diet in Vienna. The electors were "the archbishops of Mentz [Mainz], of Treves [Trier], and of Cologne, the bishops of Bamberg, of Ratisbon [Regensburg], of Frisingen [Freising], and of Padua, the count palatine of the Rhine, the duke of Bavaria, the king of Bohemia, the landgrave of Thuringia, and the duke of Carinthia". This title, though not acknowledged by Pope Gregory IX, presumed his future as a Holy Roman emperor. Prince-Archbishop Siegfried III of Mainz, in his capacity as German archchancellor, acted as regent for the minor until 1242, when Frederick chose Landgrave Henry Raspe of Thuringia, and King Wenceslaus I of Bohemia to assume this function. Conrad intervened directly in German politics from around 1240. He led the short-lived anti-Mongol crusade of 1241.

However, when Pope Innocent IV excommunicated Frederick in 1245 and declared Conrad deposed, Henry Raspe supported the pope and was in turn elected as a rival king of Germany on 22 May 1246. Henry Raspe defeated Conrad in the battle of Nidda in August 1246, but died several months later. He was succeeded as a rival king by William of Holland.

This exertion of power by the pope has since been regarded as a transition of power in the Holy Roman Empire. Notably, many princes took this opportunity to gain more influence with their vast wealth and relative stability as opposed to the fractured monarchy which had proven to be somewhat unreliable. Similarly, many nobles were given greater autonomy without the guidance of a king.

Also in 1246, Conrad married Elisabeth, a daughter of Otto II of Bavaria. They had a son Conradin, in 1252.  In 1250 Conrad temporarily settled the situation in Germany by defeating William of Holland and his Rhenish allies.

Italian Campaign
When Frederick II died in the same year, he passed Sicily and Germany, as well as the title of Jerusalem, to Conrad, but the struggle with the pope continued. Having been defeated by William in 1251, Conrad decided to invade Italy, hoping to regain the rich dominions of his father, and where his half-brother Manfred acted as regent.
In January 1252 he invaded Apulia with a Venetian fleet and successfully managed to restrain Manfred and to exercise control of the country. This year Conrad issued constitutions during the hoftag in Foggia, which were based on the well-known examples from Norman and early Staufer times. In addition, as the new sources show, Conrad tried to reconcile with the Pope, but no agreement was reached. After the death of Frederick II, riots prevailed in parts of the kingdom of Sicily, and several cities attempted to escape the royal control. Conrad was therefore forced to take military action against the revolts. In October 1253 his troops conquered Naples.

Conrad was however not able to subdue the pope's supporters, and the pope in turn offered Sicily to Edmund Crouchback, son of Henry III of England (1253). Conrad was excommunicated in 1254 and died of malaria in the same year at Lavello in Basilicata. Manfred first, and later Conrad's son Conradin, continued the struggle with the Papacy, although unsuccessfully.

Conrad's widow Elisabeth remarried to Meinhard II, Count of Tirol, who in 1286 became Duke of Carinthia.

Conrad's death in 1254 began the Interregnum, during which no ruler managed to gain undisputed control of Germany. The Interregnum ended in 1273, with the election of Rudolph of Habsburg as King of the Romans.

Ancestors

See also
Kings of Germany family tree. He was related to every other king of Germany.

References

|-

|-

|-

|-

1228 births
1254 deaths
13th-century Kings of the Romans
13th-century Kings of Sicily
13th-century kings of Jerusalem
Hohenstaufen
Medieval child monarchs
Kings of Jerusalem
Dukes of Swabia
People from Andria
People excommunicated by the Catholic Church
Deaths from malaria
13th-century people of the Holy Roman Empire
Children of Frederick II, Holy Roman Emperor
Sons of emperors